Thou Gild'st The Even is a 2013 Turkish drama film directed by Onur Ünlü.

Cast
 Ali Atay - Cemal
 Demet Evgar - Yasemin
 Damla Sönmez - Defne
 Ezgi Mola - Cigdem
 Ercan Kesal - Irfan

References

External links 

2013 drama films
2013 films
Turkish drama films